List of Girls' Doubles Junior Grand Slam tournaments tennis champions:

Champions by year

Statistics

Most Grand Slam doubles titles

Note: when a tie, the person to reach the mark first is listed first.

Three titles in a single season

Surface Slam 
Players who won Grand Slam titles on clay, grass and hard courts in a calendar year.

Channel Slam 
Players who won the French Open-Wimbledon double.

Sources
 ITF Australian Open
 ITF Roland Garros
 ITF Wimbledon
 ITF US Open

References

See also
List of Grand Slam girls' singles champions
List of Grand Slam boys' singles champions
List of Grand Slam boys' doubles champions

girls
 
Grand Slam
Girls